Protamoebae is a grouping of Amoebozoa.

References

Amoebozoa
Amorphea subphyla